Akhra Pachkoria is the current Chairman of the State Committee for Standards, Consumer and Technical Supervision of Abkhazia. Pachkoria was appointed on 1 November 2016 into the cabinet of newly appointed Prime Minister Beslan Bartsits.

References

Living people

Chairmen of the State Committee for Standards of Abkhazia
Year of birth missing (living people)
Place of birth missing (living people)